Samoans in Hawaii are Hawaii residents of Samoan descent. Samoans in Hawaii may be from or have ancestors in the independent nation of Samoa, the territory of American Samoa, or both.

History 
Due to the Immigration and Nationality Act of 1952, many American Samoans migrated to the rest of the United States. Many of them settled in Hawaii.

Samoans from the independent part of Samoa also migrated to Hawaii later on.

Demographics 
In 2010, 37,463 Hawaii residents (or 2-3% of the population) claimed Samoan ancestry, with 19,176 of them being mixed ethnicity. The vast majority of them live in Honolulu County (Oahu).

Notable Hawaii Residents of Samoan descent 

 Tulsi Gabbard, former member of the U.S. House of Representatives
 Mike Gabbard, member of the Hawaii Senate
 Cedric Gates, member of the Hawaii House of Representatives
 Konishiki Yasokichi, former sumo wrestler

References 

Samoan people
Ethnic groups in Hawaii